Benjamin Enríquez (30 September 1930 – 13 March 2014) was a Filipino boxer. He competed in the men's lightweight event at the 1952 Summer Olympics.

References

External links
 

1930 births
2014 deaths
Filipino male boxers
Olympic boxers of the Philippines
Boxers at the 1952 Summer Olympics
Place of birth missing
Lightweight boxers